Max Bartel (1879 – 2 July  1914, Nürnberg) was a German entomologist.

Max Bartel was an insect dealer (Insektenhändler) in Berlin. He specialised in Lepidoptera. He edited Die palaearktischen Grossschmetterlinge und ihre Naturgeschichte. Band 1. Leipzig, (a monograph on butterflies) with Fritz Rühl and wrote pars Sesiidae in Adalbert Seitz Macrolepidoptera of the World - Bartel, M., 1912.– 24. Familie: Ageriidae (Sesiidae) pp. 375–416, pl. 51-52, In A. Seitz (Ed.), 1906-1913.Gross-Schmett.Erde, 2: 479 pp., 56 pls.

References
Anon. 1914: Todesanzeige. Herrn Max Bartel Int. Ent. Z., Guben 8 (15): 79-82

German lepidopterists
1914 deaths
1879 births
Date of birth missing
19th-century German zoologists
20th-century German zoologists